The Ramp is a steep rocky slope 0.5 nautical miles (0.9 km) inland from Cape Evans, Ross Island. The slope is 0.5 nautical miles (0.9 km) long and rises to 50 m. Descriptively named by the British Antarctic Expedition, 1910–13.

Rock formations of the Ross Dependency
Landforms of Ross Island